MicroMasters programs are a series of online graduate level courses offered by universities through edX that one can take to develop standalone skills for career advancement or earn graduate level credentials.

First launched in September 2016 with 19 MicroMasters programs from 14 different universities as an extension of its MOOC programs. As of February 2019, 52 different MicroMasters programs are offered, with 48 in English, 3 in Spanish, and 1 in French. Each MicroMasters program is sponsored by at least one industry partner, including GE, Microsoft, IBM, Hootsuite, Fidelity, Bloomberg, Walmart, PWC, Booz-Allen Hamilton, and Ford.

Background

History 
The development of the MicroMasters was originally conceived at MIT by Sanjay Sarma, with Erdin Beshimov becoming the Founding Director of the program. In its early stage MIT offered the MicroMasters as a pilot within its supply chain management program, consulting industry leaders. The idea of the MicroMasters program started out as an iteration of the existing MOOC model when Coursera first started offering specializations for its various disciplines and a response to the changing nature of work as well as the major skills shortage impacting businesses around the world. edX subsequently applied for a trademark for "MicroMasters" in response to Udacity registering "nanodegree" as its trademark in 2014. The first 19 MicroMasters programs were subsequently launched in September 2016, in collaboration with 14 different universities. This also included Rochester Institute of Technology's MicroMasters in project management, allowing learners to use it to fulfil the prerequisite of project management education for the PMP certification.

In 2017, General Electric promised to interview any Massachusetts resident who completed a MicroMasters program in supply chain management, cybersecurity, cloud computing, or artificial intelligence.

In 2018, MIT admitted its first batch of 40 students into its blended supply chain management program from graduates of its MicroMasters program, reducing its usual 10-month program to 5 months. This pilot also saw 200,000 people signing up, 19,000 earning certificates and 800 sitting for the final proctored examination. It was reported in July 2018 that the students who were admitted into the blended program had better than average scores across the board than those who were in the residential program.

Funding 
In October 2016, the Lumina Foundation granted $900,000 to edX to create 30 more MicroMasters certificate programs.

Program structure

Prerequisites 
All MicroMasters programs are currently running on the edX MOOC platform, where learners are free to audit any of the courses and pay later should they choose to do so. Depending on the program, there are prerequisites ranging from graduate level understanding of various specific disciplines or work experienced. However, these prerequisites serve as recommended guidelines for the learners rather than a strictly enforced rule so there are no specific degree requirements for any of the courses. However, learners will have to pay if they wish to pursue a verified certificate.

Certification 
To qualify for a certificate for successfully completing a MicroMasters program, all learners are required to complete a series of interactive courses as specified in the respective MicroMasters program and achieve a minimum grade according to the institution awarding the certification.

Continuing education 
For learners interested in academic credit, the learner must be admitted into the university's respective master's program. Some programs, such as the MicroMasters Program in Supply Chain Management by MIT also operate on a blended learning model which include a timed examination as well as a final proctored examination. Admission requirements for its on-campus blended learning program differ from its traditional residential admission requirements as applicants are not required to submit scores in a GRE or GMAT as performance in the Micromasters program will be taken as a substitute for it. Some other programs still follow usual admission guidelines and the MicroMasters program has little to no impact on their application apart from receiving advanced credits upon admission into its respective programs. Generally, most courses include practice exercises which are ungraded as well as graded assignments with limited attempts.

The following is a list of the current MicroMasters programs offered as well as the respective graduate degree options available for each program upon graduation of the MicroMasters program.

Demographics 
According to a report by Columbia University's Teachers College, a typical MicroMasters student is well-educated and employed, with almost 80% having an undergraduate degree or better. The majority of the learners are between the age of 22 and 44, with the United States and India forming 16% and 14% of the learners, followed by Brazil, Colombia, and Nigeria forming the next 3%. The majority of learners have also shown fluency or proficiency in English.

References 

Alternative education
Higher education
Open educational resources
Educational technology
Distance education